Maurice MacBrien (died 1586) was a Roman Catholic prelate who served as Bishop of Emly (1567–1586).

Biography
On 24 January 1567, he was appointed during the papacy of Pope Pius V as Bishop of Emly. On 7 October 1571, he was consecrated bishop by Scipione Rebiba, Cardinal-Priest of Santa Maria in Trastevere. with Umberto Locati, Bishop of Bagnoregio, and Eustachio Locatelli, Bishop of Reggio Emilia, serving as co-consecrators. He served as Bishop of Emly until his death in 1586.

References 

16th-century Roman Catholic bishops in Ireland
Bishops appointed by Pope Pius V
1586 deaths